William Peacock (6 December 1891 – 14 December 1948) was a Scottish water polo player who competed in the 1920 Summer Olympics for Great Britain. He was part of the British team, which was able to win the gold medal.

See also
 Great Britain men's Olympic water polo team records and statistics
 List of Olympic champions in men's water polo
 List of Olympic medalists in water polo (men)

References

External links
 

1891 births
1948 deaths
Scottish male water polo players
Water polo players at the 1920 Summer Olympics
Olympic water polo players of Great Britain
Scottish Olympic medallists
Olympic gold medallists for Great Britain
Olympic medalists in water polo
Medalists at the 1920 Summer Olympics